Hypopyra guttata is a moth of the family Erebidae. It is found in South Africa.

References

External links

 Swedish Museum of Natural History - picture of the typus

Endemic moths of South Africa
Moths described in 1856
Hypopyra